The Catacombs is a Czechoslovak comedy film directed by Martin Frič. It was released in 1940.

Cast
 Vlasta Burian as Borman, oficiál
 Jaroslav Marvan as Sýkora, prednosta úradu
 Čeněk Šlégl as Krystof, reditel Pozemkového úradu
 Theodor Pištěk as Klásek, prezidiální
 Adina Mandlová as Nasta Borková
 Antonín Novotný as Dr. Marek, úredník
 Raoul Schránil as Ing. Jirí Rudík
 Nataša Gollová as Irena Krystofová
 Růžena Šlemrová as Malvína Klásková
 Miloš Nedbal as Kefurt, vrchní revident
 Bohuš Záhorský as Hlinka, revident

References

External links
 

1940 films
1940 comedy films
1940s Czech-language films
Czechoslovak black-and-white films
Films directed by Martin Frič
Czechoslovak comedy films
UFA GmbH films
1940s Czech films